Caetano Penna Franco Altafin Rodrigues da Cunha (born January 13, 1983) is an entrepreneur, attorney and ocean rower. In 2015, he became the first Brazilian citizen to row across the North Atlantic Ocean after 43 days to promote osteosarcoma research.

Before, he had founded the NGO Library Tree in 2006, responsible for promoting and creating local libraries in Brazil. He had also founded a Brazilian retail store named MinD in 2014, a home design company. He has a Master of Law from Harvard Law School.

He was featured in the 2011 documentary Bildungsroman.

References

Living people
Brazilian businesspeople
Harvard Law School alumni
21st-century Brazilian lawyers
Brazilian male rowers
1983 births